The 2022–23 Army Black Knights men's basketball team represented the United States Military Academy in the 2022–23 NCAA Division I men's basketball season. The Black Knights, led by seventh-year head coach Jimmy Allen, played their home games at Christl Arena in West Point, New York as members of the Patriot League.

Previous season
The Black Knights finished the 2021–22 season 15–16, 9–9 in Patriot League play to finish in fifth place. As the No. 5 seed, they lost to No. 4 seed Lehigh in the quarterfinals of the Patriot League tournament.

Roster

Schedule and results

|-
!colspan=12 style=| Non-conference regular season

|-
!colspan=12 style=| Patriot League regular season

|-
!colspan=9 style=| Patriot League tournament

|-

Sources

References

Army Black Knights men's basketball seasons
Army
Army Black Knights men's basketball
Army Black Knights men's basketball